1891–92 in Scottish football was the 19th season of competitive football in Scotland and the second season of Scottish league football.

League competitions

Scottish Football League 

Dumbarton were crowned Scottish Football League champions after sharing the title the previous season.

Other honours

Cup honours

National

County

Non-league honours

Senior

Scotland national team

Key:
 (H) = Home match
 (A) = Away match
 BHC = British Home Championship

Other national teams

Scottish League XI

See also
1891–92 Rangers F.C. season

Notes

References

 
Seasons in Scottish football